Vidarte is a surname. Notable people with the surname include:

Walter Vidarte (1931–2011), Uruguayan actor
Paco Vidarte (1970–2008), Spanish philosopher, writer, and activist